Stanhopea hernandezii is a species of orchid endemic to central and southwestern Mexico.

References

External links 

hernandezii
Endemic orchids of Mexico
Flora of Central Mexico
Flora of Southwestern Mexico